Runaway Sunday is the sixth studio album by Altan, released in July 1997 on the Virgin Records label.

Track listing
All titles arranged by Altan.

 "Súil Ghorm" – 2:45
 "John Doherty's Reels" – 2:35
 "Caidé Sin Don Té Sin?" – 3:13
 "Germans" – 3:13 (barn dances)
 "Clan Ranald/J.B.'s Reel/Paddy Mac's Reel/Kitty Sheáin's" – 4:17
 "I Wish My Love Was a Red Red Rose" – 3:50
 "Mazurka" – 2:29
 "Australian Waters" – 3:27
 "A Moment in Time" – 3:17
 "Ciarán's Capers" – 3:29
 "Cití Ní Eadhra" – 3:06
 "Flood in the Holm/Scots Mary/The Dancer's Denial" – 3:52
 "Gleanntáin Ghlas' Ghaoth Dobhair" – 3:27
 "Time Has Passed" – 3:32

All titles are traditional, with the following exceptions:
"Súil Ghorm" – composed by Mairéad Ní Mhaonaigh
"Time has passed" – composed by Mairéad Ní Mhaonaigh
"A Moment in Time" – composed by Mairéad Ní Mhaonaigh and Mark Kelly
"The Dancer's Denial" – composed by Mark Kelly
"Paddy Mac's Reel" – composed by Ciaran Tourish
"Gleanntáin Ghlas' Ghaoth Dobhair" – lyrics by Proinsias Ó Maonaigh

Live recordings
A live recording of "John Doherty's Reels" performed by Altan in early August 2002 at the Cambridge Folk Festival is available on the Cool as Folk 2-CD collective album. Released in 2007, this compilation includes a total of 36 live recordings from the Cambridge Folk Festival between 1999 and 2006.

Personnel

Altan
Mairéad Ní Mhaonaigh – Fiddle, vocals
Ciaran Tourish – Fiddle, whistle, backing vocals
Dermot Byrne – Accordion, melodeon
Ciarán Curran – Bouzouki, bouzarre, mandolin, backing vocals
Mark Kelly – Guitar, bouzouki, backing vocals
Dáithí Sproule – Guitar, backing vocals

Guest musicians
Stephen Cooney – Double Bass, didgeridoo
Pat Crowley – Piano
Jerry Douglas – Dobro
Jimmy Higgins – Percussion
Alison Krauss –  Backing vocals
Dónal Lunny – Keyboards, bodhrán
Neil Martin – Cello, keyboards
Matt Molloy – Flute

Production
Altan – producers
Alastair McMillan – producer, engineer
Conan Doyle – assistant engineer
Brian Masterson – mixer
Dave McKean – photography, design

References

Altan (band) albums
1997 albums
Albums with cover art by Dave McKean